Schlossplatz is the main square in the city of Oldenburg, Lower Saxony, Germany.

The square is used for outdoor markets.
To the southeast is Schloss Oldenburg. To the southwest is Schlossgarten Oldenburg. To the northwest is St Lamberti-Kirche. To the north is the Schlosshöfe shopping centre.

See also
 List of visitor attractions in Oldenburg

References

Geography of Oldenburg
Tourist attractions in Oldenburg (city)
Squares in Oldenburg (city)